The Arkansas Association was an intercollegiate athletic college football conference that existed from 1927 and 1929. Its membership was centered on the state of Arkansas. Its membership subsequently joined the Arkansas Intercollegiate Conference.

Champions

1927 – Henderson-Brown and Ouachita Baptist
1928 – Henderson-Brown
1929 – Henderson State

See also
List of defunct college football conferences

References

Defunct college sports conferences in the United States